Eleanor O'Donnell (born 1 September 1998) is a Scottish badminton player who competes in international level events. Her highest achievements were winning a silver medal at the 2017 European Junior Championships and competing as the youngest competitor of the Scottish team at the 2018 Commonwealth Games.

Achievements

European Junior Championships 
Mixed doubles

BWF International Challenge/Series (2 titles, 1 runner-up) 
Women's doubles

Mixed doubles

  BWF International Challenge tournament
  BWF International Series tournament
  BWF Future Series tournament

References

External links 
 

1998 births
Living people
People from Beith
Sportspeople from North Ayrshire
Scottish female badminton players
Badminton players at the 2018 Commonwealth Games
Badminton players at the 2022 Commonwealth Games
Commonwealth Games competitors for Scotland